Ganisa is a genus of moths of the family Eupterotidae first described by Francis Walker in 1855.

Selected species
Ganisa cyanogrisea Mell, 1929
Ganisa floresiaca Nässig, 2009
Ganisa gyraleus Orhant, 2000
Ganisa longipennata Mell, 1958
Ganisa plana Walker, 1855
Ganisa postica Walker, 1855
Ganisa pulupuluana Nässig, Ignatyev & Witt, 2009
Ganisa similis Moore, 1884

Status unknown
Ganisa aponoides
Ganisa cyanomelaena
Ganisa javana
Ganisa lignea

Former species
Ganisa glaucescens Walker, 1855
Ganisa kuangtungensis
Ganisa melli
Ganisa pandya Moore, 1865

References

 , 2009: Two new species of the genus Ganisa Walker, 1855 from Sulawesi and Flores, Indonesia (Lepidoptera: Eupterotidae). Entomofauna 30: 453-464.
 , 2000: Description of a new species of the genus Ganisa Walker (Eupterotidae) from Thailand. Tinea 16(3): 149-150.

Bombycoidea
Macrolepidoptera genera